Tropidophoxinellus is a genus of cyprinid fish found in Europe. There are currently two described species.

Species
 Tropidophoxinellus hellenicus (Stephanidis, 1971)
 Tropidophoxinellus spartiaticus (Schmidt-Ries, 1943)

References 

 
Cyprinidae genera
Cyprinid fish of Europe
Taxonomy articles created by Polbot
Taxa named by Alexander I. Stephanidis